Brahmasamudram is a village in Anantapur district of the Indian state of Andhra Pradesh. It is the headquarters of Brahmasamudram mandal in Kalyandurg revenue division.

Demographics 
According to Indian census, 2001, the demographic details of Brahmasamudram mandal is as follows:
 Total Population: 	39,518	in 7,438 Households.
 Male Population: 	20,120		and Female Population: 	19,398
 Children Under 6-years of age: 	6,134	(Boys -	3,113 and Girls -	3,021)
 Total Literates: 	15,164

References 

Villages in Anantapur district
Mandal headquarters in Anantapur district